Return of Jewel Thief is a 1996 Indian Hindi-language crime action thriller film directed by Ashok Tyagi. It is a sequel to the 1967 film Jewel Thief, that starred Ashok Kumar and Dev Anand who reprise their roles in this film. The cast of the film also includes Dharmendra, Jackie Shroff, Shilpa Shirodkar, Anu Aggarwal and Madhoo. 

Unlike the predecessor, this film was a box office failure. This was the last release of Aggarwal.

Plot 

The British Government agrees to lend the priceless Kohinoor diamond for an exhibition to the multi-billionaire Vinay Kumar, on posting the security of Vinay's jewel collection worth Rs.500 billion. Despite top security, the Kohinoor diamond gets stolen. The prime suspects are Vinay himself, as simultaneously his jewel collection posted as security goes missing; Police Commissioner Surya Dev Singh, the very last person to have supposedly handled the diamond as also being the son of Prince Arjun, the jewel thief from the original film; Con-man Johnny, who has acquired a reputation of being a jewel thief; Jukaso, a gangster of international repute; and Chief Minister Neelkanth who had, in the presence of  Surya Dev Singh, kept the Kohinoor in his safe. With the Chief Minister and the Police Commissioner themselves suspects, no one really knows who the real criminal is.

Cast 
Ashok Kumar...  Prince Arjun
Dev Anand...  Vinay Kumar / Prince Amar
Dharmendra...  Police Commissioner Surya Dev Singh
Jackie Shroff...  Jatin Kumar 'Johnny'
Shilpa Shirodkar...  Sonu
Anu Aggarwal...  Princess Vishaka
Madhoo...  Madhoo
Prem Chopra...  Minister Neelkanth
Sadashiv Amrapurkar...  Jukaso
Hemant Choudhary... Police Officer

Soundtrack 
The soundtrack and background score were composed by Jatin–Lalit  and all the lyrics were penned by Anand Bakshi.

References

External links 

1990s Hindi-language films
1996 crime thriller films
1996 films
Films scored by Jatin–Lalit
Indian crime thriller films
Indian sequel films